The Upbeat is a band formed in 1985 in the small beach-side community of Carpinteria, California. Heavily influenced by the 2 Tone Ska of the late 70s and early 80s, the group was formed by Alfredo “Fredo” Peralta (lead vocals), Mike "Oreo" Organista (lead vocals), Eric "Scaric" Vallen (rhythm guitar), Brandon "Hossinn" Seider (bass guitar), Grant "Saxpa" Cox (saxophone), Mike "Pussard" Honeyman (trumpet), Chaska "The Weasel" Slawson (drums), and Mark "Sparky" Gonzales (Merchandise Master/Designated Driver). 2011 saw the introduction of new members, ska/reggae/rocksteady legends Zac Pike (lead guitar) and Dan Boer (keys), from the bands Sandollar Sounds and Dynamic Pressure, as well as Brian "Polar Bear" LeBlanc (drums), from Santa Barbara's Civil Unrest and Makai. Their members Dan Boer and Zac Pike created music for Cartoon Network's Chowder.

Immediately after the band started, they began to play local parties in the nearby college town of Isla Vista, CA (University of California at Santa Barbara), as well as accepting opportunities to play gigs at more famous clubs such as The Country Club and Fenders Ballroom in Los Angeles and The Stone and Slims in San Francisco. After being exposed to the many iterations of the ska genre, the band began to be known for playing a unique blend of ska, roots reggae, and rock steady, with politically and environmentally conscious lyrics. In 1993, driven by their desire to promote the music they loved, The Upbeat released their debut 5 track demo under the moniker "Upbeat Recordings". This stark freshman effort garnered them airplay across the country and a series of compilation offers from the likes of Epitaph/Hellcat Records, Moon Records, and SRH Presents.

In 1995, the band released their first full-length album which sold 5,000+ units with virtually no promotional support or distribution. By this time their live reputation preceded them, sending them into a series of surf, skate and snowboard videos including Transworld Skateboarding and Transworld Snowboarding Video Magazine and Fox Sports Net, which brought the band even further praise, securing them a worldwide fan base and setting the stage for the band’s subsequent, prolific west coast touring. During this time, The Upbeat shared the stage with the likes of such varied artists as The Skatalites, Burning Spear, Sublime, Sugar Ray, No Doubt, Bad Manners, The Specials, The Wailers, Fishbone, Steel Pulse, and The Twinkle Brothers, to name a few.

"Backyard Knowledge," The Upbeat's second album, was released in 2000, and ten years later (2010), a host of new songs were released on their album, "Shuku". The title song, Shuku Power, is a tribally influenced testament to the band's respect and admiration for the Native Chumash that walked their hometown ground, many years before them. More specifically, the Shuku were a people that inhabited Rincon Point, which happens to be a popular surf spot often frequented by the band's members.

The band continues to forge their own unique path, making their mark on the road of ska, reggae and rocksteady. Their new song, "Where Have All the Rude Boys Gone? (WHATRBG?)" (B. Leblanc / The Upbeat) is an anthem style tune that is part reminiscent of the ska days of old, and part look forward to the rude future ahead. It is currently available on 7" vinyl and can be downloaded for free at: https://soundcloud.com/the-upbeat/where-have-all-the-rude-boys-gone

Current Lineup
Mike Organista - Vocs
Brandon Seider - Bass Guitar
Eric Vallen - Rhythm Guitar
Zac Pike - Lead Guitar 
Nathan Dowdall - Organ/Electric Piano 
Grant Cox - Saxophone/Vocs
Mike Honeyman - Trumpet/Vocs
Chaska Slawson - Drums

Previous Members of The Upbeat (in order of past appearance)
 Lennie Price - Trumpet
 Jon Wilcox - Trumpet
 Brian Leblanc - Drums
 Eric Lundy - Lead Guitar
 Nathan Dowdall - Organ/Keys
 Alfredo Peralta - Vocs
 Rodney Teague - Trombone
 David Lombera - Organ/Keys
 Gabe Cheshire - Baritone Sax
 Brett Keller - Trombone
 Paul Torres - Vocals
 JJ - Drums
 David Granada - Drums
 Eric Herzogg - Drums
 Collin - Drums
 George Manuras - Drums

References

External links 
 https://www.facebook.com/pages/The-Upbeat/33799128924
 https://soundcloud.com/the-upbeat

American ska musical groups
Musical groups established in 1985
Musical groups from California
1985 establishments in California